The tenth season of Calle 7 began on July 23, 2012, new contestants were introduced and some former participants returned.

Contestants

Notes
 The contestant returned to the game.

Elimination order

2012 Chilean television seasons